This Is Us is an American family  drama television series.

This Is Us may also refer to:

Music
 This Is Us (Backstreet Boys album), 2009
 This Is Us (The Necessary album), 2005
 This Is Us (EP), a 2018 extended play by BtoB
 "This Is Us", a song by LL Cool J from his 2000 album G.O.A.T.
 "This Is Us", a song by Emmylou Harris and Mark Knopfler from their collaborative 2006 album All the Roadrunning

Other uses
 One Direction: This Is Us, a 2013 music documentary